A penumbral lunar eclipse took place on August 17, 1951. The northern edges of the moon entered the southern edge of the earth's penumbral shadow, leading to visually minimal dimming.

Visibility

Related lunar eclipses

Lunar year series

Metonic cycle (19 years) 

This is the third of five Metonic lunar eclipses.

See also 
List of lunar eclipses
List of 20th-century lunar eclipses

Notes

External links 
 

1951-08
1951 in science